The Beulah Grove Lodge No. 372, Free and Accepted York Masons, also known as Pleasant Grove School and Pleasant Grove Colored School, in Douglas County, Georgia near Douglasville, Georgia, was built in 1910.  It was listed on the National Register of Historic Places in 2010.

It is a two-story wood building.

References

Masonic buildings in Georgia (U.S. state)
National Register of Historic Places in Douglas County, Georgia
Buildings and structures completed in 1910